The 1964 UCI Road World Championships took place from 3 to 6 September 1964 in Sallanches, France.

Results

Medal table

See also 

 1964 UCI Track Cycling World Championships

External links 
 Men's results
 Women's results

 
UCI Road World Championships by year
International cycle races hosted by France
Uci Road World Championships, 1964
UCI Road World Championships
UCI Road World Championships